Casey A. Mize (born May 1, 1997) is an American professional baseball pitcher for the Detroit Tigers of Major League Baseball (MLB). He was selected by the Tigers with the first overall pick in the 2018 MLB draft. He played college baseball for the Auburn Tigers.

Amateur career
Mize attended Springville High School in Springville, Alabama. During his high school career, he went 19–2. He committed to Auburn University to play college baseball.

As a freshman in 2016, he appeared in 16 games with 7 starts and went 2–5 with a 3.52 earned run average (ERA) and 59 strikeouts. After the 2016 season, he played collegiate summer baseball with the Wareham Gatemen of the Cape Cod Baseball League. As a sophomore in 2017, Mize pitched in 13 games with 12 starts, going 8–2 with a 2.04 ERA with 109 strikeouts and only nine walks. After the season, he played for the United States collegiate national team during the summer. Mize was named Auburn's opening day starter for the 2018 season. On March 9, 2018, Mize threw a no-hitter against the Northeastern Huskies, the ninth in program history. Mize finished the 2018 season 10-6 with a 3.30 ERA and 156 strikeouts over 17 starts.

Professional career

Minor leagues

2018 
The Detroit Tigers selected Mize with the first overall pick in the 2018 MLB draft. On June 25, 2018, Mize signed with the Tigers, featuring a $7.5 million signing bonus. He made his professional debut with the Gulf Coast Tigers of the Rookie-level Gulf Coast League. After one start, he was promoted to the Lakeland Flying Tigers of the Class A-Advanced Florida State League. After compiling a combined 0–1 record with a 3.95 ERA in five starts between both teams, Mize was shut down for the rest of the season due to an innings limit.

2019 
In 2019, the Tigers invited Mize to spring training as a non-roster player. He returned to Lakeland to begin the 2019 season, and was its Opening Day starter. After making four starts for Lakeland with an 0.35 ERA, the Tigers promoted Mize to the Erie SeaWolves of the Class AA Eastern League. In his first start for Erie, he tossed a no-hitter, in which he hit a batter, walked another, and struck out seven on 98 pitches, in a 1–0 SeaWolves victory over the Altoona Curve. On June 15, Mize was placed on the 7-day injured list with shoulder inflammation.

Detroit Tigers

2020 
On August 19, 2020, Mize was promoted to the major leagues by the Tigers and made his MLB debut that evening against the Chicago White Sox. Mize threw 73 pitches over  innings in his first start, allowing three earned runs while striking out seven and walking none in a no-decision. On September 11 against the Chicago White Sox, Mize took a no-hitter into the sixth inning, before a double by Yolmer Sánchez ruined the no-hit bid. With the 2020 Detroit Tigers, Mize appeared in seven games, compiling a 0–3 record with 6.99 ERA and 26 strikeouts in  innings pitched.

2021 
On March 26, 2021, Tigers manager A. J. Hinch announced that Mize would be in the Tigers starting rotation to begin the 2021 season. On April 12, Mize earned his first major league win, throwing seven scoreless innings in the Tigers' 6–2 victory over the Houston Astros. In an August 24 road game against the St. Louis Cardinals, Mize made his major league debut as a batter, and collected an RBI on a bases-loaded walk. He also earned the win with five scoreless innings. Mize made 30 starts in the 2021 season, posting a 7–9 record and 3.71 ERA. He struck out 118 batters in  innings, while allowing 130 hits and 41 walks for a 1.137 WHIP.

2022 
Mize began the 2022 season as the No. 2 starter in the Tigers rotation. On April 15, the Tigers placed Mize on the 10-day injured list with a right elbow sprain. On June 10, he went on the Tigers' 60-day Injured List. It was revealed that Mize needed Tommy John surgery, which prematurely ended his 2022 season.

Personal
Mize and his wife, Tali, were married in 2019. They reside in Nashville, Tennessee.

References

External links

Auburn Tigers bio

1997 births
Living people
All-American college baseball players
Auburn Tigers baseball players
Baseball players from Alabama
Detroit Tigers players
Erie SeaWolves players
Gulf Coast Tigers players
Lakeland Flying Tigers players
Major League Baseball pitchers
People from Springville, Alabama
United States national baseball team players
Wareham Gatemen players